Banana Peel  is a 1963 French-Italian-German comedy film starring Jeanne Moreau and Jean Paul Belmondo. Costumes by Pierre Cardin.

It recorded admissions in France of 1,909,913.

Plot

Cast 
Jeanne Moreau as Cathy / Madame Volney
Jean-Paul Belmondo  as  Michel Thibault
Claude Brasseur  as Charlie Meyer 
Jean-Pierre Marielle  as  Paul Reynaldo
Gert Fröbe as Raymond Lachard
Paulette Dubost as  Germaine Bontemps / Madame Bordas
Alain Cuny  as  Hervé Bontemps
Charles Regnier  as   Bontemps
 Cathy Baïeff as  Lachard's lover 
 Henri Poirier as  Antoine

References

External links

Banana Peel at Variety Distribution
Banana Peel at Le Film Guide

1963 films
West German films
Films directed by Marcel Ophuls
Films based on American novels
Films about con artists
German crime comedy films
French crime comedy films
Italian crime comedy films
1960s French-language films
1960s French films
1960s Italian films
1960s German films